The 2016–17 Tercera División was the fourth tier in Spanish football. It began on 20 August 2016 and ended on 26 June 2017 with the promotion play-off finals.

Competition format
The top four eligible teams in each group will play the promotion playoffs.
The champion of each group will qualify to the 2017–18 Copa del Rey. If the champion is a reserve team, the first non-reserve team will qualify instead.
In each group, at least three teams will be relegated to Regional Divisions.

Group 1 – Galicia

Teams

League table

Top goalscorers

Top goalkeeper

Group 2 – Asturias

Teams

League table

Top goalscorers

Top goalkeeper

Group 3 – Cantabria

Teams

League table

Top goalscorers

Top goalkeeper

Group 4 – Basque Country

Teams

League table

Top goalscorers

Top goalkeeper

Group 5 – Catalonia

Teams

League table

Top goalscorers

Top goalkeeper

Group 6 – Valencian Community

Teams

League table

Top goalscorers

Top goalkeeper

Group 7 – Community of Madrid

Teams

League table

Top goalscorers

Top goalkeeper

Group 8 – Castile and León

Teams

League table

Top goalscorers

Top goalkeeper

Group 9 – Eastern Andalusia and Melilla

Teams

League table

Top goalscorers

Top goalkeeper

Group 10 – Western Andalusia and Ceuta

Teams

League table

Top goalscorers

Top goalkeeper

Group 11 – Balearic Islands

Teams

League table

Top goalscorers

Top goalkeeper

Group 12 – Canary Islands

Teams

League table

Top goalscorers

Top goalkeeper

Group 13 – Region of Murcia

Teams

League table

Top goalscorers

Top goalkeeper

Group 14 – Extremadura

Teams

League table

Top goalscorers

Top goalkeeper

Group 15 – Navarre

Teams

League table

Top goalscorers

Top goalkeeper

Group 16 – La Rioja

Teams

League table

Top goalscorers

Top goalkeeper

Group 17 – Aragon

Teams

League table

Top goalscorers

Top goalkeeper

Group 18 – Castilla-La Mancha

Teams

League table

Top goalscorers

Top goalkeeper

References

External links
Royal Spanish Football Federation website

 
Tercera División seasons

4
Spain